Fort Ligonier is a British fortification from the French and Indian War located in Ligonier, Pennsylvania, United States. The fort served as a staging area for the Forbes Expedition of 1758. During the eight years of its existence as a garrison, Fort Ligonier was never taken by an enemy. It served as a post of passage to the new Fort Pitt, and during Pontiac's War of 1763, was a vital link in the British communication and supply lines. It was attacked twice and besieged by the Native Americans, prior to the decisive victory at Bushy Run in August of that year.  The fort was decommissioned from active service in 1766. Today, there is a museum next to the reconstructed fort. Inside the museum there are artifacts from the battle. An individual can take a guided tour of the fort, and on Fort Ligonier Days, the fort's cannons are fired.

Forbes' campaign

French victories over George Washington and Edward Braddock in 1754–55 wrested from Britain control of the strategic forks of the Ohio River (modern Pittsburgh). By 1758, General John Forbes was assigned the daunting task of seizing Fort Duquesne, the French citadel at the forks. He ordered construction of a new road across Pennsylvania, guarded by a chain of fortifications, the final link being the "Post at Loyalhanna," fifty miles from his objective.

The fort was constructed in September 1758. By late October, George Washington had arrived at Loyalhanna, but not before the defeat of a British force at Fort Duquesne on September 14, and the successful defense of Loyalhanna from a French attack on October 12. Heavily outnumbered and losers in Indian diplomacy, the French abandoned Fort Duquesne, which Forbes occupied on November 25. He designated the site "Pittsburgh" in honor of Secretary of State William Pitt. Forbes also named Loyalhanna "Fort Ligonier" after his superior, Sir John Ligonier, commander-in-chief in Great Britain.

Campaign timeline

 August 10, 1758—Colonel Bouquet ordered Major James Grant to build a road from Bedford to Ligonier (within striking distance of the French Fort Duquesne).
 August 15, 1758—Col. Bouquet sent Ensign Charles Rohr, engineer for General Forbes, to the future site of Fort Ligonier to select a location for a storehouse there.
 August 20, 1758—Col. Bouquet sent Major Grant, Col. James Burd and 1,500 men to the site to begin construction. Grant was in overall charge of the fort and men.
 August 21, 1758—Ensign Rohr picked the exact location for the fort.
 August 22, 1758—Col. Bouquet ordered Col. Burd's men and some artillerymen to build a  storehouse for supplies and a hospital.
 August 27, 1758—Burd and Rohr reported the location of a superior site to Ligonier, nine miles (14 km) to the west. When told of the new site, Forbes directed that work continue on Fort Ligonier, since construction had already begun.
 August 29, 1758—Col. Burd and troops arrived at Fort Ligonier and built trenches around the fort.
 September 1, 1758—Bouquet sent 100 men to entrench the "Grants Paradise" location south of Latrobe, Pennsylvania. 
 September 9, 1758—Major Grant left Fort Ligonier with troops and headed west to Fort Duquesne. On September 15, he approached within five miles (eight km) of Fort Duquesne before being beaten by the French, when his deliberate plan to lure out and ambush the fort's defenders went badly wrong. Bouquet arrived at Fort Ligonier with troops and wrote to Sinclair about the conditions of the fort, area and supplies, including wagons.
 October 12, 1758—While the fort was still under construction, the Battle of Fort Ligonier was fought; the four-hour assault resulted in a French defeat. The French forces attempted to attack again at nightfall, but were forced to retreat by mortar fire from the fort.
 November 12, 1758—The command of Col. Forbes ran across another squad of De Vitri's French troops lurking around Fort Ligonier. The British attacked, killing one and taking three prisoners. One of the prisoners turned out to be an Englishman who had been taken from his home in Lancaster County by anti-British Native Americans. His information concerning the weak condition of Fort Duquesne was corroborated by that of the French prisoners. Forbes therefore resolved to push forward to capture Fort Duquesne.
 November 12, 1758—Units led by George Washington (1st Virginia) and Lieutenant Colonel George Mercer (2nd Virginia) accidentally engaged each other in heavy fog and at night. Two officers and 38 men were killed or wounded.
 November 1758—4,000 troops encamped at the fort, making Ligonier the second-largest community in Pennsylvania.
 November 25, 1758—Forbes captured Fort Duquesne.
 March 1766—Fort Ligonier was abandoned after the conclusion of the French and Indian War.

References

Further reading
 "The Frontier Forts of Western Pennsylvania," Albert, George Dallas, C. M. Busch, state printer, Harrisburg, 1896. Plan of the fort, pg. 208B.
 William M. Fowler, Jr., Empires at War: The French and Indian War and the Struggle for North America, 1754–1763 (2005).
 Pennsylvania's Forbes Trail, Burton K. Kummerow, Christine H. O'Toole, R. Scott Stephenson (2008).

External links

 Fort Ligonier official website
 [ National Register nomination documentation]

Ligonier
Ligonier
Ligonier
Military and war museums in Pennsylvania
Museums in Westmoreland County, Pennsylvania
Ligonier
Ligonier
National Register of Historic Places in Westmoreland County, Pennsylvania
1758 establishments in the Thirteen Colonies